Ozagrel (INN) is an antiplatelet agent working as a thromboxane A2 synthesis inhibitor.

References

Imidazoles